Judge Van Sickle may refer to:

Bruce Van Sickle (1917–2007), judge of the United States District Court for the District of North Dakota
Frederick L. Van Sickle (1943–2021), judge of the United States District Court for the Eastern District of Washington